35-åringen is the ninth studio album by Swedish pop and rock artist Magnus Uggla. It was released in 1989. The album was awarded a Rockbjörnen award in the category "Swedish record of the year".

Track listing 
All lyrics written by Magnus Uggla. All music by Uggla and Anders Henriksson who is also responsible for the arrangements.
Side one
 "Stig in och ta en cocktail" - 3:55
 "Baby Boom" - 5:27
 "P-F" - 4:24
 "Jätte-kult" - 4:47
 "Dum dum" - 5:05
Side two
 "Jag mår illa" - 4:06
 "Rembrant" - 5:08
 "Dyra tanter" - 5:12
 "Moder Svea" - 5:30

The first edition of the LP, MC, and CD contained a song named Stig in och ta en cocktail. Later, another version of it was made, which is a track on a later album. That version was also released as a single.

Charts

References

1989 albums
Magnus Uggla albums
Swedish-language albums